To Be or Not to Bop: Memoirs of Dizzy Gillespie is a 1979 book written by jazz musician, composer and band leader Dizzy Gillespie. The book was released in July 1979 by Doubleday. The University of Minnesota Press re-released the book in 2009.

Background
He is known for being the father of bebop. This book tells about his life, and what he went through to make this music flourish. The book introduces Dizzy and his friends like Charlie "Bird" Parker as they struggled to make money by playing. Later on it tells of how Dizzy became a great trumpeter and even the origin of his signature bent trumpet.

Various compositions and albums have been named after Gillespie's book title.

See also
Biographies of other famous trumpeters
Still Grazing: The Musical Journey of Hugh Masekela (2004) by Hugh Masekela
Straight Life: The Story of Art Pepper (1979) by Art Pepper

References

External links 
Google book profile

1979 non-fiction books
Music autobiographies